David John Howitt (born 4 August 1952) is an English former professional footballer who made 194 appearances in the Football League playing for Birmingham City, Bury, Workington and Aldershot.

Howitt was born in Birmingham. When he left Hodge Hill School in 1968, he joined Birmingham City as an apprentice, and turned professional two years later. At school he had played as a midfielder, but became a full back while in Birmingham's reserves. He made his debut in the First Division on 30 August 1972 in a 2–2 draw away to West Bromwich Albion, but dropped out of consideration once Ray Martin was available again. He was released at the end of the 1972–73 season, and went on to play for Bury, Workington and Aldershot, for whom he played 137 league games. He became player-manager of Southern League Midland Division club Milton Keynes City, then played for Milton Keynes Borough and Newport Pagnell Town.

References

1952 births
Living people
Footballers from Birmingham, West Midlands
English footballers
Association football fullbacks
Birmingham City F.C. players
Bury F.C. players
Workington A.F.C. players
Aldershot F.C. players
Milton Keynes City F.C. players
Milton Keynes Borough F.C. players
Newport Pagnell Town F.C. players
English Football League players
Southern Football League players
English football managers